The Finland men's national under-18 ice hockey team is the men's national under-18 ice hockey team of Finland. The team is controlled by the Finnish Ice Hockey Association, a member of the International Ice Hockey Federation. The team represents Finland at the IIHF World U18 Championships.

International competitions

IIHF European U18 / U19 Championships

IIHF World U18 Championships

References

External links
 Team Finland all time scoring leaders in IIHF U18 World Championships
Finland at IIHF.com

 
Under
National under-18 ice hockey teams